Timothy Charles Robert Noel Bentinck, 12th Earl of Portland, Count Bentinck und Waldeck Limpurg,  (born 1 June 1953), commonly known as Tim Bentinck, is an English actor and writer, known for his long-running role as David Archer in the BBC Radio 4 series, The Archers.

He was a member of the House of Lords from 1997 to 1999. He is also Count Bentinck in the peerage of the Holy Roman Empire.

Early life
The son of the non-conformist intellectual Henry Bentinck, Portland was born on a sheep station in Barton, Tasmania, Australia, but moved with his family to Berkhamsted in England at the age of two. He was educated at a prep school, then Harrow School, and finally at the University of East Anglia, where he spent much of his time on productions of its drama society, before receiving a BA degree in the History of Art. After graduation, he trained in acting at the Bristol Old Vic Theatre School.

Career
Bentinck has been an actor since 1978 and is known for the roles of David Archer in the BBC Radio 4 series The Archers and Tom Lacey in the BBC TV drama series By the Sword Divided (1983–85). He is also a voice-over artist, having provided the voice of James Bond for the video-game The World Is Not Enough (Nintendo 64 and PlayStation version), and the voice of Roger Radcliffe in 101 Dalmatians II: Patch's London Adventure.  Between 1990 and 2006 he was also the voice of "Mind The Gap" on the London Underground Piccadilly line. Bentinck has a long list of theatre, television and film credits. He appeared in The Thick of It in 2005 and 2007 and starred with David Jason in The Royal Bodyguard in 2012.

As himself, Bentinck has appeared on Call My Bluff, won a round of University Challenge, Celebrity Mastermind, Pointless Celebrities and beaten Judith Keppel on science in Celebrity Eggheads.

Bentinck has revoiced Gérard Depardieu in the film Nouvelle France, and Chow Yun Fat in Crouching Tiger, Hidden Dragon. He has provided post-production voices for many major US and UK film and television productions since helping provide the voices of both Scottish and English armies alongside Mel Gibson in Braveheart. 

His first film role was as 'Harris', Roger Moore's lieutenant in North Sea Hijack; other film roles include William Goldman's The Year of the Comet, the western, The Pride of Wade Ellison as well as the short film, Locked Up by Bugsy Riverbank Steel – winner of Best Foreign Short Film at the Lanzarote Film Festival in 2013. Also Fast Girls, The Redistributors, Rule Number Three with Nicholas Hoult, The Pirates of Penzance with Kevin Kline, Trevor Nunn's Twelfth Night, Vanity Fair, the U-boat commander in Enigma, Fantastic Beasts and Where to Find Them, and many short and student films. In 2018 he starred with Jack Roth as Conrad in the Netflix movie, Us And Them. He played the role of Frederick Forsyth in the BBC television film Reg (2016).

On stage, after many London fringe theatre appearances, Bentinck starred as the Pirate King in The Pirates of Penzance at the Theatre Royal, Drury Lane in 1982, as Captain Brice in Arcadia at the Theatre Royal, Haymarket, and as Hubert Laurie in Night Must Fall, also at the Haymarket. Bentinck toured a one-man show, Love Your Chocolates, – a mixture of stories, comedy songs and multi-media, and played Frank in Educating Rita at the Watermill Theatre, Newbury, Berkshire, in 2009.

Bentinck regularly writes travel articles for The Mail on Sunday and his book, Avant Garde A Clue, co-written with Albert Welling, is published on Kindle. In March 2015, his children's book, Colin The Campervan, was published by FBS Publishing.

Bentinck's autobiography, Being David Archer - And Other Unusual Ways of Earning a Living was published by Constable in 2017.

Bentinck has made many guest appearances in Big Finish audio dramas, including versions of Doctor Who, Torchwood, Blake's 7 and Space 1999. He has also narrated over sixty audiobooks.

In the 2018 Queen's Birthday Honours, he was appointed Member of the Order of the British Empire (MBE) for services to drama.

Bentinck is also an inventor with several patents to his name, as well as a programmer/web site designer, musician and writer.

Television
Bentinck's roles on television include:
 Gentleman Jack
 Flack
 The Game
 The Politician's Husband
 The Royal Bodyguard
 Tales of the Unexpected (The Stinker)
 Twenty Twelve
 The Thick of It
 Doctors
 Broken News
 Shadow Play
 Sharpe's Rifles
 The Armando Iannucci Shows
 A Prince Among Men
 Grange Hill
 Made in Heaven
 Square Deal
 By the Sword Divided
 EastEnders
 Silent Witness

Video games
Bentinck has also done voicework for numerous videogame titles:
 The Feeble Files
 The World Is Not Enough
 007 Racing
 Prisoner of War
 Secret Weapons Over Normandy
 James Bond 007: Everything or Nothing
 Knights of Honor
 Medieval II: Total War
 Heavenly Sword
 Hellgate: London
 Viking: Battle for Asgard
 Rhodan: Myth of the Illochim
 Memento Mori
 Divinity II
 Venetica
 Dragon Age II
 Star Wars: The Old Republic
 The Book of Unwritten Tales
 Deponia
 Risen 2: Dark Waters
 The Secret World
 The Night of the Rabbit
 The Raven: Legacy of a Master Thief
 Total War: Rome II
 The Dark Eye: Demonicon
 Broken Sword 5: The Serpent's Curse
 Blackguards
 Dark Souls II
 Lego The Hobbit
 Grid Autosport
 Sacred 3
 Risen 3: Titan Lords
 Dreamfall Chapters
 The Book of Unwritten Tales 2
 Warhammer: End Times – Vermintide
 Deponia Doomsday
 Dark Souls III
 Total War: Warhammer
 Lego Marvel Super Heroes 2
 Warhammer: Vermintide 2
 Anno 1800

Titles
On the death of the 9th Duke of Portland in 1990, Bentinck's father Henry, his sixth cousin succeeded to the earldom of Portland. In 1997 Tim succeeded his father. He took a seat in certain sittings of the House of Lords but made no speeches (nor questions) before losing the right and not standing for selective internal election, under the House of Lords Act 1999.

On 29 December 1732, the Hon. William Bentinck, Baron Bentinck of the Duchy of Guelders (second surviving son of Hans Willem Bentinck), was made a Count of the Holy Roman Empire as Count (Graf) Bentinck, by Imperial Letters Patent of Ferdinand I, Holy Roman Emperor. This title also vests in him. Under the Royal Warrant of 27 April 1932 on Foreign Titles the dispensation granted by Queen Victoria to use the title and daughters' styles socially in Great Britain was rescinded beyond any living heirs, the last of which were Bentinck's late father and aunt.

Personal life
Bentinck married the milliner Judith "Judy" Ann Emerson (born Newcastle-under-Lyme, 10 October 1952) in London on 8 September 1979. They have two sons: William Jack Henry Bentinck, Viscount Woodstock (born London, 19 May 1984) and The Hon. Jasper James Mellowes Bentinck (born London, 12 June 1988). They reside in London.

References

External links

Tim Bentinck's website - official website of the actor

Actor Tim Bentinck - Who's who The Archers, BBC Radio 4

|-
of the Holy Roman Empire

1953 births
Alumni of Bristol Old Vic Theatre School
Alumni of the University of East Anglia
Tim
British people of Dutch descent
British people of English descent
Counts of the Holy Roman Empire
Portland, Timothy Bentinck, 12th Earl of
English autobiographers
English male radio actors
English male soap opera actors
English people of Dutch descent
Living people
Male actors from Hertfordshire
Male actors from Tasmania
Members of the Order of the British Empire
People from Berkhamsted
People educated at Harrow School
Teutonic Knights
The Archers
Portland